Vernon is an unincorporated community in Kent County, Delaware, United States. Vernon is located along Delaware Route 14, west of Harrington.

References

Unincorporated communities in Kent County, Delaware
Unincorporated communities in Delaware